Simon Pietersz Verelst (1644–1721?) was a Dutch Golden Age 
painter. He is known for outstanding flower and fruit still life paintings.

Biography
Verelst was born in The Hague.  He was the son of Pieter Harmensz Verelst and became a pupil in the Confrerie Pictura at the same time as his brother Herman in 1663. In 1668 he moved to London and on 11 April 1669 he met with Samuel Pepys. His elegant portraits became popular for a time during the 1670s among court circles. He painted this portrait of Prince Rupert, son of Frederick V, Count Palatine and Elizabeth Stuart. It seems Verelst began to suffer from bouts of insanity, which was reflected in a portrait with flowers on a gigantic scale, who called himself "the God of Flowers". In 1709, according to Weyerman, he lived down the Strand, London at the art dealer William Lovejoy, who had him locked up for his bouts of unbridled aggression.

Family tree

References

External links

Simon Pietersz Verelst on Artnet
Simon Verelst on PubHist

1644 births
1710 deaths
Dutch Golden Age painters
Dutch male painters
Painters from The Hague
Artists from The Hague
Dutch still life painters
Dutch portrait painters